Kutsuki (written: 朽木) is a Japanese surname. Notable people with the surname include:

, Japanese samurai
, Japanese daimyō
, Japanese samurai

See also
, former village in Shiga Prefecture, Japan

Japanese-language surnames